The Corbiculacea are a suborder of freshwater clams, aquatic bivalve molluscs in the order Venerida.

References

Venerida
Mollusc suborders
Obsolete animal taxa